Guido Visser (born 22 July 1970) is a Canadian former cross-country skier who competed in the 1998 Winter Olympics.

References

1970 births
Living people
Canadian male cross-country skiers
Olympic cross-country skiers of Canada
Cross-country skiers at the 1998 Winter Olympics